Anthrax analis is a species of bee fly in the family Bombyliidae. It's a parasitoid whose hosts include Cicindela  scutellaris, Cicindela hirticollis, Cicindela marginata, Cicindela punctulata, and Cicindela tranquebarica.

Distribution
Canada, Mexico, United States, Costa Rica, Cuba, Nicaragua.

References

Bombyliidae
Insects described in 1823
Taxa named by Thomas Say
Diptera of North America